|}

The Newmarket Stakes is a Listed flat horse race in Great Britain open to three-year-old colts and geldings. It is run over a distance of 1 mile and 2 furlongs (2,012 metres) on the Rowley Mile at Newmarket in late April or early May.

History
The original version of the Newmarket Stakes was established in the early 19th century. It was usually held on the final day of the venue's First Spring meeting in late April or early May. It was run on the Ditch Mile course over distances slightly under a mile. It ended after a period of small fields and walkovers in the 1880s.

A new version of the race was introduced in 1889. From this point it took place at Newmarket's Second Spring meeting in mid-May. It was contested over 1¼ miles, and it became a major trial for The Derby. It continued until the early 1960s.

The present version of the race was first run in 1978. It was initially called the Heathorn Stakes. The inaugural running was won by the subsequent Derby winner Shirley Heights. It was renamed the Newmarket Stakes in 1986.

The Newmarket Stakes is currently held on the opening day of the three-day Guineas Festival meeting in late April or early May.

Records

Leading jockey since 1978 (6 wins):
 Pat Eddery – Theatrical Charmer (1990), Walim (1991), Tenby (1993), Sandstone (1997), Beat All (1999), Rosi's Boy (2001)

Leading trainer since 1978 (10 wins):
 Sir Henry Cecil – Masked Marvel (1979), Mr Fluorocarbon (1982), Claude Monet (1984), Slip Anchor (1985), Verd-Antique (1986), Tenby (1993), Dr Fong (1998), Beat Hollow (2000), Kandahar Run (2008), Noble Mission (2012)

Winners since 1978

Earlier winners

First Spring version
The original version of the race was held at Newmarket's First Spring Meeting in late April or early May.

 1804: Prospero
 1805: Lydia
 1806: Achilles
 1807: Musician
 1808: Morel
 1809: Thunderbolt
 1810: Whalebone
 1811: Trophonius
 1812: Pointers
 1813: Smolensko
 1814: Blucher
 1815: Busto
 1816: Alien
 1817: Gazelle
 1818: Roger Bacon
 1819: Tiresias
 1820: Ivanhoe
 1821: Gustavus
 1822: Mystic
 1823: Nicoli
 1824: Serab
 1825: Crockery
 1826: Goshawk
 1827: Serenade
 1828: Zinganee
 1829: Patron
 1830: Augustus
 1831: Riddlesworth
 1832: Mixbury
 1833: Forester
 1835: Bodice
 1836: Muezzin
 1837: Rat-Trap
 1838: Boeotian
 1839: Montreal
 1840: Scutari
 1841: John o' Gaunt
 1842: Canadian
 1843: Evenus
 1845: Idas
 1846: Pyrrhus the First
 1847: Cossack
 1848: Glendower
 1849: Vatican
 1850: Cariboo
 1851: Midas
 1852: Stockwell
 1853: Orinoco
 1855: De Clare
 1856: Wentworth
 1857: Glee-Singer
 1858: Beadsman / Eclipse *
 1859: Phantom
 1860: St Albans
 1861: Russley
 1862: Canwell
 1863: Mogador
 1864: Claremont
 1866: Robin Hood
 1867: Marksman
 1868: The Earl
 1869: Strathnairn
 1870: Nobleman
 1871: King William
 1872: Cremorne
 1873: Andred
 1874: George Frederick
 1876: Skylark
 1877: King Clovis
 1878: Reefer
 1879: Muley Edris
 1880: Merry-Go-Round
 1881: Iroquois
 1882: Milord
 1883: Merrimac
 1885: Palladio
 1886: Lisbon
 1887: declared void

* The 1858 race was a dead-heat and has joint winners.

Second Spring version
The next version was held at Newmarket's Second Spring Meeting in mid-May.

 1889: Donovan
 1890: Memoir
 1891: Mimi
 1892: Curio
 1893: Isinglass
 1894: Ladas
 1895: The Owl
 1896: Galeazzo
 1897: Galtee More
 1898: Cyllene
 1899: Dominie
 1900: Diamond Jubilee
 1901: William the Third
 1902: Fowling-Piece *
 1903: Flotsam
 1904: Henry the First
 1905: Cicero
 1906: Lally
 1907: Acclaim
 1908: St Wolf
 1909: Louviers
 1911: Sunstar
 1912: Cylgad
 1913: Craganour
 1914: Corcyra
 1915: Danger Rock
 1916: Figaro
 1918: Somme Kiss
 1919: Dominion
 1920: Allenby
 1921: Lemonora
 1922: Pondoland
 1923: Top Gallant
 1924: Hurstwood
 1925: Cross Bow
 1926: no race
 1927: Call Boy
 1928: Fairway
 1929: Hunter's Moon
 1930: The Scout II
 1931: Sir Andrew
 1932: Miracle
 1933: Young Lover
 1934: Windsor Lad
 1935: Bobsleigh
 1936: Flares
 1937: Cash Book
 1938: Golden Sovereign
 1939: Fairstone
 1940: Lighthouse
 1941: Orthodox
 1945: Midas
 1946: Radiotherapy
 1947: Blue Train
 1948: Riding Mill
 1949: Faux Tirage
 1950: Prince Simon
 1951: Crocodile
 1952: Chavey Down
 1953: Pinza
 1954: Elopement
 1955: Acropolis
 1956: Pirate King
 1957: Sun Charger
 1958: Guersillus
 1959: Agricola
 1960: Stupor Mundi
 1961: The Axe
 1962–77: no race

* Ard Patrick finished first in 1902, but he was disqualified for bumping and boring.

See also
 Horse racing in Great Britain
 List of British flat horse races

References

 Paris-Turf:
 Racing Post:

 galopp-sieger.de – Newmarket Stakes.
 pedigreequery.com – Newmarket Stakes – Newmarket.
 

Flat horse races for three-year-olds
Newmarket Racecourse
Flat races in Great Britain